Omsk Oblast is a federal subject of Russia (an oblast), located in southwestern Siberia. Its population is 1,977,665 (2010 Census) with the majority, 1.12 million, living in Omsk, the administrative center.

The oblast borders Tyumen Oblast in the north and west, Novosibirsk Oblast and Tomsk Oblast in the east, and Kazakhstan in the south.

Geography
Omsk Oblast shares borders with Kazakhstan (North Kazakhstan Region and Pavlodar Region) to the south, Tyumen Oblast in the west and Novosibirsk Oblast and Tomsk Oblast in the east. It is included in the Siberian Federal District.

The main water artery is the Irtysh River and its tributaries the Ishim, Om, Osha, and Tara Rivers. The region is located in the West Siberian Plain, consisting of mostly flat terrain. In the south is the Ishim Plain, gradually turning into steppe, forest and swampy taiga to the north. The soil is sandy and silty. Along the Irtysh River, in t. N. Irtysh region, there is an "oasis" microclimate, with a wooded landscape and gullies. There, the most fertile land in the region can be found. The Omsk region contains many lakes, the largest of which are Tenis-Saltaim, Ik, Ebeyty, Ulzhay and Tobol-Kushly.

The highest elevation in the Omsk region - about  Upland village, the lowest elevation is the water's edge on the Irtysh - , near the village of Little Beach. 

The property is located in Omsk region 28 specially protected natural territories of regional destinations. Including parks in Bolshereche and Omsk ("Bird's harbor").

Climate
The oblast has a classic continental climate, with cold, snowy winters and hot, dry summers. Annual rainfall averages . Sunny days predominate.

The southern plains have notably longer and warmer summers and a delayed onset of freezing temperatures. They are also significantly drier than the northern forests, receiving only  precipitation annually. Winters, however, are as severe on the plains as they are further north. Spring rains are rare, but late spring freezes are not. The early part of the summer is frequently dominated by hot, dry southern winds.

Ecology
 on the territory of the Omsk region, there are 35 areas that have the status of protected areas (PAs), regional and local importance.

History

Prehistory and the Middle Ages
Archeological findings indicate that the present day territory of the oblast has been inhabited for the last 14,000 years. Neolithic societies in the area lived by fishing and hunting. About three thousand years ago, pastoralism began to take hold. Ust'-Ishim man, the remains of a man that lived 45,000 years ago, was discovered in Omsk Oblast.

Various Turkic states dominated the area throughout the Medieval era. The most notable of these were the Western Turkic Khaganate and the Siberian Khanate. Siberian Tatars, Mongols, Khanty and Mansi tribes, along with others, inhabited the territory.

Exploration of Siberia
The Russian history of Omsk began with the 1584 arrival of a Cossack force under the command of ataman Yermak, who defeated local rulers and established nominal Russian control of the area. To support further expansion tsars Feodor I and Boris Godunov initiated the construction of fortified settlements and military outposts in the south of Siberia in order to defend their subjects from raiding nomadic tribesmen and to exert authority over local populations, specifically over the tribute-paying Siberian Tatars of The Baraba Lands. The first permanent Russian settlement in the region, the city of Tara, was founded in 1594, soon it began to play an important part in fur trade that connected Russia with Central Asia and China.

In 1716 a fortress was constructed at the confluence of the Om and Irtysh rivers on the orders of sublieutenant Ivan Bugholtz. The fortress would form the nucleus for the development of the future city of Omsk. By the second half of the 18th century, Omsk fortress was the largest building of any kind in the eastern part of Russia.

As Russian settlements continued to spread through the Yenisei, Tobol and Irtysh watersheds in the course of the 18th century, so did the development of the Omsk and the surrounding region. In 1753 a customs post was established to tax goods brought into the city by the ever-increasing trade with Kazakh tribesmen. In 1764, when he Siberian provinces of Russia were organized into two governorates with centers in Irkutsk and Tobolsk, the city of Tara and the fortress of Omsk were assigned to the latter. In 1780, on the orders of Catherine the Great the fortress was transferred to Kolyvan Oblast. By this time Omsk had grown to the size of a small city, however, from 1797 to 1804 it did not possess its own uyezd.

Russian Empire
In 1804, the territories surrounding Omsk were organized into the Omsk Okrug. The city rose to prominence when Siberia was once again reorganized in 1822, Omsk became the administrative center of the General Governorate of Eastern Siberia rising above the old center of Siberia, Tobolsk. The new governorate was divided into oblasts around the cities of Omsk, Petropavlovsk, Semipalatinsk and Ust-Kamenogrsk populated by Russian colonists and okrugs populated by Kazakh nomads. In subsequent reforms the name of the Oblast was changed repeatedly to The Oblast of The Siberian Kyrgyz (1854), Akmolinsk Oblast (1868), and Omsk Oblast (1917) before finally reverting to the Omsk Governorate in 1918. The authority of the oblast followed further expansion of the empire to Central Asia and included significant parts of modern-day Kazakhstan.

In the 19th century, Omsk, given its strong system of frontier fortresses, became notorious as a premier destination for political exiles and prisoners from the European part of the Russian Empire. Decembrists, Polish rebels, French prisoners of war and political activists of every stripe found their way to Siberia. Among them was Fyodor Dostoyevsky, who spent four years (1850–1854) at the Omsk prison.

The early nineteenth century also saw the growth of industry in the city and in the rest of the Irtysh basin. The Siberian Cossack Army was headquartered in Omsk after 1808 and contributed to the development of the city, by the beginning of the 20th century the Cossacks were a dominant component in the society of both the city of Omsk and the surrounding lands, having reached a population of 174 thousand and holding title to five million hectares of agricultural land. The 18th and 19th centuries also saw the influx of a significant number of German immigrants both from Russia's Volga Regions and from abroad.

Soviet years
In 1925 the Omsk governorate was dissolved into the newly formed Siberian Krai and again reorganized, this time as an Oblast by order of the All-Russian Central Executive Committee on 7 December 1934. Parts of the Ob-Irtysh Oblast and the West Siberian Krai as well as the southern part of Chelyabinsk Oblast were given over to Omsk. In 1943, Kurgan Oblast created from the western portion of the Chelyabinsk Oblast also got a number of Omsk territories. In 1944, the northern part of the Omsk Oblast along with the districts previously transferred to Kurgan became newly established Tyumen Oblast that included Khanty-Mansi and Yamalo-Nenets autonomous okrugs.

The 1950s saw the creation of the petroleum processing industry, as well as the development of various high-technology facilities that came to define the economy of the Oblast for the remainder of the century.

Post-Soviet era
With the dissolution of the Soviet Union the oblast became part of the newly independent Russian Federation. The independence of Kazakhstan gave Omsk an international border to the south, while continued federal policy aiming to rectify the effects of Stalin era population transfers led to the creation of a national German district in an area with a significant, although not a majority, German population around the town of Azovo. On 19 May 1996 Omsk Oblast signed a power-sharing agreement with the federal government, granting it autonomy. This agreement would be abolished on 21 December 2001.

Politics
During the Soviet period, the high authority in the oblast was shared between three persons: The first secretary of the Omsk CPSU Committee (who in reality had the biggest authority), the chairman of the oblast Soviet (legislative power), and the Chairman of the oblast Executive Committee (executive power). Since 1991, CPSU lost all the power, and the head of the Oblast administration, and eventually the governor was appointed/elected alongside elected regional parliament.

The politics in the oblast is governed by the Charter of Omsk Oblast. The laws within the authority of the oblast are passed by the Legislative Assembly of Omsk Oblast which is the legislative (representative) body. The highest executive body is the Omsk Oblast Administration. It also includes the executive bodies of the subdivisions such as districts, and is responsible for the daily administration. The Oblast administration supports the activities of the Governor who is the head of the oblast and acts as guarantor of the observance of the Charter in accordance with the Constitution of Russia.

Administrative divisions

Economy
 Omsk Oblast is the 23rd largest economy in Russia, with a gross regional product of 10.2 billion dollars.

The economy of Omsk Oblast is heavily industrial, with well developed, and growing, service and financial sectors. Agriculture represents a smaller, but still significant, portion of the economy.

Economic activity is concentrated in Omsk, with over sixty-six thousand private enterprises registered, ranging from small-scale retailers to billion-dollar manufacturing.

Omsk was ranked by Forbes as the 6th-best city in Russia for business in 2008, an improvement over its 20th-place ranking the previous year.

The oblast and city governments have made efforts to improve the business climate and foster small enterprise through various incentives and government programs designed to ease the bureaucratic red-tape, a notorious feature of Russian business life, and to generate cooperation within the business community.

The bulk of industrial output, as of 2009, is concentrated in food and tobacco processing ($900 million), hydrocarbon processing ($6.7 billion), chemical manufacturing ($500 m), plastics manufacturing ($200 m) and the manufacture of electrical components ($280 m). The remainder of the economy is dominated by the retail sector and agriculture.

The largest industrial enterprises include the aerospace manufacturer Polyot, the Omsk Aggregate Plant, the agricultural manufacturer Sibzavod, Omsk Baranov Motorworks, and Omsktransmash, which manufactures the T-80 main battle tank. Additionally, Omsk Rubber, the Technical Hydrocarbon Plant, Omsk-Polymer and Omsk Hydrocarbon Processing Plant, represent the petroleum and hydrocarbon industry. Omsk Hydrocarbon is one of the most important oil refineries in Russia.

The oblast operates four thermal power plants, which makes it largely self-sufficient from the standpoint of energy generation.

Agricultural production is concentrated in the Isil'rul'skii District and produces wheat, barley, flax, sunflower, potato, various fruits and vegetables as well as meat, poultry and dairy products.

The food processing sector includes several breweries, a distillery and numerous food packaging enterprises.

Demographics
Population: 

Vital statistics for 2012
Births: 29 475 (14.9 per 1000)
Deaths: 27 197 (13.8 per 1000)
Total fertility rate: 
2009 - 1.58 | 2010 - 1.60 | 2011 - 1.66 | 2012 - 1.86 | 2013 - 1.87 | 2014 - 1.95 | 2015 - 1.91 | 2016 - 1.81(e)

According to the 2010 Census, the ethnic composition was:
85.8% Russian
4.1% Kazakh
2.7% Ukrainian
2.6% German
2.2% Tatar
0.4% Armenian
0.3% Belarusians
other groups of less than five thousand persons each
57,518 people were registered from administrative databases, and could not declare an ethnicity. It is estimated that the proportion of ethnicities in this group is the same as that of the declared group.

According to Russia's 2002 Census, Omsk Oblast has one of the lowest birth rates in Siberia. However, birth rates remain higher than the average in heavily German districts - Azovsky Nemetsky National District (24% German), Moskalensky, Poltavsky (22% Ukrainian & 11% German) and Isilkulsky (8% German), even as significant emigration to Germany acts to reduce the overall birth rate. In 2009, the lowest death rate was recorded for Azovsky German National Raion (9.4 per 1000) and the highest birth rate was recorded for Moskalenskom (17.0 per 1000), Isilkulskom (15.2), Maryanovsky (15.8), Pavlogradski (15.8), Tevrizskom (16.6), Ust-Ishim (15.4) and Sherbakulskom (16.2). Regions with the highest population growth were Moskalensky area (5.5 ppm), Azovsky German National Raion (4.8 ppm), Sherbakulsky (3.8 ppm) and Pavlogradskij (3.2 ppm).

Ethnic Russian birth rate in the province is significantly lower than that of the ethnic Kazakhs (by 50%) and that of ethnic Germans (by 20%), according to the 2002 Census.

Religion

According to a 2012 survey 35.7% of the population of Omsk Oblast adheres to the Russian Orthodox Church, 3% are unaffiliated generic Christians, 2% adheres to Islam, 1% to the Slavic native faith (Rodnovery), 0.5% to the Catholic Church. In addition, 39% of the population declares to be "spiritual but not religious", 13% is atheist, and 5.8% follows other religions or did not give an answer to the question.

Notable people
 

John Kornievsky (1910–1984), Russian Greek Catholic priest

Sister relationships
 Pest County, Hungary

See also

2007 Siberian orange snow
List of Chairmen of the Legislative Assembly of Omsk Oblast
List of rural localities in Omsk Oblast
Омская область

References

 
States and territories established in 1934